Ander Barrenetxea may refer to:
Ander Barrenetxea (cyclist) (born 1992), Spanish cyclist
Ander Barrenetxea (footballer) (born 2001), Spanish footballer